David John Twardzik (born September 20, 1950) is an American former professional basketball player.  He was a point guard in both the American Basketball Association (ABA) and the National Basketball Association (NBA).  He is best known for being a key starting guard on the Portland Trail Blazers team that won the 1977 NBA Finals.

Twardzik grew up in Middletown, Pennsylvania, and played collegiately at Old Dominion University, where he was a two-time All-American and led the Monarchs to the 1971 NCAA Division II title game. He was drafted by the Trail Blazers in 1972, but elected to play for the Virginia Squires of the ABA.  Twardzik played for the Squires for four seasons until the team (and the ABA) came to an end, folding just prior to the ABA-NBA merger in June 1976.  After the ABA-NBA merger Twardzik signed with the Blazers (who held his NBA rights).  He would be the starting two-guard of the Blazers team which won the NBA title in 1977. He played for four seasons total in Portland, and retired at the end of the 1979–80 season because of injury.  His jersey number (13) was retired by the team.

After his retirement from playing, he began an NBA coaching and front-office career. He served in Portland's front office through 1985, and worked as an assistant coach for the Indiana Pacers from 1986 through 1989. He has also worked for the Detroit Pistons, Charlotte Hornets, Los Angeles Clippers, Golden State Warriors, and the Denver Nuggets. In 2003, he became Director of Player Personnel for the Orlando Magic, and was promoted to assistant general manager in 2005. He held that position until 2012. Since the 2013-14 basketball season, Twardzik has been a color commentator for radio broadcasts of Old Dominion's Men's Basketball games.

In 1995, Twardzik was inducted into the Virginia Sports Hall of Fame.

References

External links
 Player bio at Old Dominion
 Pro stats at basketball-reference.com
 Orlando Magic Executives

1950 births
Living people
American men's basketball players
Basketball players from Pennsylvania
Detroit Pistons assistant coaches
Golden State Warriors executives
Indiana Pacers assistant coaches
Los Angeles Clippers assistant coaches
National Basketball Association players with retired numbers
Old Dominion Monarchs men's basketball players
Orlando Magic executives
People from Middletown, Pennsylvania
Point guards
Portland Trail Blazers draft picks
Portland Trail Blazers players
Virginia Squires players